The Canton of Val-Couesnon (before March 2020: canton of Antrain) is a canton of France, in the Ille-et-Vilaine département, located in the northeast of the department.

At the French canton reorganisation which came into effect in March 2015, the canton was expanded from 10 to 31 communes (11 of which merged into the new communes Maen Roch, Les Portes du Coglais, Saint-Marc-le-Blanc and Val-Couesnon).

Composition

It consists of the following communes:
 
Andouillé-Neuville
Aubigné
Bazouges-la-Pérouse
Le Châtellier
Chauvigné
Feins
Gahard
Maen Roch
Marcillé-Raoul
Montreuil-sur-Ille
Mouazé
Noyal-sous-Bazouges
Les Portes du Coglais
Rimou
Romazy
Saint-Aubin-d'Aubigné
Saint-Germain-en-Coglès
Saint-Hilaire-des-Landes
Saint-Marc-le-Blanc
Saint-Rémy-du-Plain
Sens-de-Bretagne
Le Tiercent
Val-Couesnon 
Vieux-Vy-sur-Couesnon

Councillors

Pictures of the canton

References

Cantons of Ille-et-Vilaine